"This Road" is a song written and recorded by Australian country singer James Blundell. The song was released on 1 June 1992 as the second single from his third studio album, This Road (1992). The song peaked at number 26, becoming Blundell's second top 30 single in Australia.

Track listings
 CD Single (EMI – 8740012)
 "This Road" - 3:48
 "All That I Need" - 4:02	
 "The Old Man's Gone" - 3:13

Weekly charts

References

James Blundell (singer) songs
1992 songs
1992 singles
EMI Records singles